Charles Péguri (Marseilles 31 October 1879 – 21 March 1930) was a French accordionist of Italian descent and one of the creators of the musette genre.

References

1879 births
1930 deaths
French accordionists
French people of Italian descent
20th-century French musicians
Place of birth missing